Esther Mahlangu (born 11 November 1935) is a South African artist. She is known for her bold large-scale contemporary paintings that reference her Ndebele heritage. She is one of South Africa's best known artists.

Early life
Esther Nikwambi Mahlangu was born on 11 November 1935 in a farm located outside of Middelburg, Mpumalanga, South Africa, and belongs to the South Ndebele people. Mahlangu began painting at 10 years of age, and was taught the skill of mural painting by her mother and grandmother, following a tradition of the South Ndebele people for females to paint the exterior of houses. It is in this cultural tradition where Mahlangu first began her artistic journey. She had eight younger siblings, which was made up of six boys and three girls (including her). She and her husband had three sons. Later on, she lost her husband and two out of her three sons. She was an employee at the Botshabelo Museum before becoming an artist.

Artistic career
Mahlangu's art references patterns found in clothing and jewellery of the Ndebele people. The patterns she uses are typically very colourful and geometric. Her paintings are large in scale.Esther Mahlangu used brushes made from chicken feathers. She is known for translating and substituting the traditional surfaces for Ndebele mural art, adobe cow-dung wall, with canvas, and eventually, metal alloys. Mahlangu’s signature pattern of white bounded lines set diagonally or shaped like chevrons. She signs all of her beadwork in beads with the initials “E M”. As an artist, her “...composition is more compact, more engaging and complex than that of her contemporaries, the borders more complicated. She has a tendency to frame her pattern motifs.”

Mahlangu first gained international attention in 1989 at a French art exposition titled Magiciens de la terre (Magicians of the World). Later in 1991, she was commissioned by BMW to create an art car, as other BMW Art Car creators had done before (including Andy Warhol, David Hockney and Frank Stella). The car, a BMW 525i, was the first "African Art Car" and was painted with typical Ndebele motifs. The car was later exhibited at the National Museum of Women in the Arts in Washington, DC in 1994. It was also exhibited at the British Museum, London in 2017.

Shows 

 1989
 Magiciens de la terre (Centre Georges Pompidou) in Paris (1989):

 1992
 Carav Cultural Center of Contemporary Art
 Comme des Garcons (Tokyo, Japan; New York, USA; Paris, France)
 Documenta 9
 Civic Theatre

 1991
 Caravan Auto Show (Lavante)
 BMW Art Cars and Painting Exhibition (Johannesburg, Durban, Cape Town)

 1993
 Geneva International Exhibition (Geneva)
 Nantes Fine Arts Museum

 1994
 Musee des Beauz- Arts de Nantes (1994)

 1995
 BMW Art Cars and Painting Exhibition
 Market Theatre

 1996
 World Bank
 Armour J. Blackburn Centre, Howard University
 Parish Gallery
 Congressional Black Caucus

 1997
 Het Afrika Museum
 National Arts Club
 African Immigrant Folklife Festival
 Spoleto Festival
 York College Galleries

 1998
 Tobu Museum of Art

 1999
 Van Reekum Museum

 2000
 5th Biennal of Contemporary Art

 2001
 The Helsinki Fair Center

 2002
 Centro Culturale Trevi

 2003
 The Irma Stern Museum

 2005
 Museum of Fine Arts
 Grimaldi Forum
 Pretoria Art Museum
 Smithsonian Institution

 2006
 The Jean Pigozzi Contemporary African Art Collection
 Tacoma Museum of Art
 Roppongi Hills Art Museum
 Scuderie Aldobrandini Frascati

 2007     
 Art in Public Spaces
 The Walters Art Museum
 Durban Art Gallery
 Pinacoteca Giovanni e Marella Agnelli

 2008
 Denver Museum of Art

 2009
 Complesso Monumentale del Vittoriano\

 2011
 Museum of Arts and Design

 2013
 34 Fine Art

 2014
 Museum of African Art (2014)

  2015     
 The Irma Stern Museum
 Amref Health Africa Artball

 2016
 Frieze Art Fair

 2017
 Cape Town Art Fair (2017)

 2019
 National Museum Oliewenhuis
 Cape Town Art Fair

 2020
 Melrose Gallery
 Investec Cape Town Art Fair

 2021
 Almine Rech

 2022
 Alpha 137 Online Gallery
 Melrose Gallery

Other exhibitions 

Between 1980 and 1991 she was a resident at the Botshabelo Historical Village open-air museum, which presents and educates the visitors about the Ndebele culture.

Ndebele designs were also reproduced in 1997 on the tails of British Airways planes and more recently the same technique was used by the artist to paint on the new Fiat 500 on the occasion of the exhibition "Why Africa?" (2007, Turin).

Mahlangu is one of the African artists whose art is often exhibited internationally. Her works are in major private collections including that of The Contemporary African Art Collection (CAAC) of Jean Pigozzi and in many Western museums. Despite being an internationally recognized artist, Esther Mahlangu still presently lives in her village in close and constant contact with her culture.

Themes
Mahlangu follows a local tradition through which this particular type of painting technique is handed down in the family, communicated, learned and transmitted only by women (in the past). These paintings are closely connected with the tradition of decorating the houses on the occasion of the rite of passage for boys. Between 18 and 20 years of age, the youth of the tribe go to "a school of circumcision", the ritual that confirm their passage to adulthood. To celebrate this event the women completely repaint the inside and the outside of their houses with a preparation of cow dung and natural pigments. Brightly coloured acrylic paints are also applied in designs outlined by black lines. Although seemingly simple, the geometric abstraction that is revealed by these paintings is underscored by the constant repetition and symmetry of such simple shapes that make the whole work quite complex.

The art of Esther Mahlangu highlights the tension between local and global, between the anchor and detachment. Despite continuing to use the same "artistic vocabulary" closely tied to her traditions, Mahlangu has applied the designs to various objects including canvas, sculpture, ceramics and automobiles. She has also collaborated with various brands like BMW, Fiat, EYTYS, Melissa's, Beleverde, the British Museum and Rolls-Royce.

Present day

Esther Mahlangu's 1991 BMW Artcar was on view at the British Museum as part of 'South Africa: the art of a nation', from 27 October 2016 - 27 February 2017. The new BMW Individual 7 series with unique internal wooden trims painted by her was exhibited at Frieze Art Fair in 2016 with an accompanying exhibition of work co-curated by BMW and 34FineArt. She recently completed a special edition premium Belvedere Vodka bottle design (50% of all profits to help fight HIV/AIDS in Africa). As an artist in residence, Mahlangu was commissioned in 2014 by the Virginia Museum of Fine Arts to create two large works of art.

Mahlangu directs a school which teaches young girls not only painting but also the technique of painting designs on particular compositions of beads. The tradition is not a static entity. As the work of the same Mahlangu suggests, "tradition" is a mobile field, future-oriented and ready to incorporate diverse stimuli. In fact, although South Africa is now one of the African States which is able to facilitate and promote the work of their artists both nationally and internationally with the likes of the biennial event in Johannesburg, the work of Esther Mahlangu is even more courageous because she was born and grew up in political and social turmoil.

Esther Mahlangu has worked tirelessly exposing and developing her talent travelling around the world, and she is very passionate about sharing her knowledge with the younger generation so that she leaves a legacy that lives on for generations to come.

Robbery
On 19 March 2022 Mahlangu was a victim of house robbery where she was attacked and assaulted, her house was ransacked personal possessions were stolen including a gun and an undisclosed amount of money. The crime sparked outrage raising the alarm about the high crime rate in South African and manhunt was launched by the South African police to catch the perpetrator. The suspect was apprehended and put into custody until April 20, 2022 for a formal bail application. An accomplice was released on bail and had a court hearing on May 10.

Awards and honours 

 Awarded the Order of Ikhamanga in 2006.
 Received the first United Nations High Commissioner for Refugees (UNHCR) South Africa NGO and Multi-Stakeholder Award in 2019.
 Conferred with an honorary doctorate (Philosophiae Doctor honoris causa) by the University of Johannesburg, 9 April 2018.

References

External links

Esther Mahlangu 80 Exhibition online 2015
Contemporary African Art Collection, Geneva
 Esther Mahlangu 2003 Exhibition catalogue 2003 
Mam' Esther Mahlangu: the Ndebele Picasso, Ayiba Magazine, December 2015
"In conversation with Esther Mahlangu" , ARTsouthAfrica (2015)

1935 births
Living people
People from Middelburg, Mpumalanga
Southern Ndebele people
South African women painters
Recipients of the Order of Ikhamanga
20th-century South African painters
21st-century South African painters
20th-century South African women artists
21st-century South African women artists
Illustration